Christian Dietrich Meier Zender (born June 23, 1970), best known as Christian Meier, is a Peruvian actor and singer in Latin America, the US Hispanic market, and around the Spanish speaking world.

Biography
Meier was born in Lima, Peru, the youngest of four siblings. He is the son of Gladys Zender, Miss Universe 1957, and Antonio Meier, a Peruvian politician who in 2006 was elected mayor of the Lima district of San Isidro. He has two older sisters and one older brother: Sibylle Meier Zender, Karina Meier Zender, and Antonio Meier Zender. 

Raised in the Roman Catholic faith, Christian 
Meier studied at the Miraflores Maristas School, a Marist Brothers congregation school. After finishing high school he studied Graphic Design graduating in early 1992.

Career

Musician
In 1987, he formed the popular Peruvian alternative-rock band Arena Hash  with Pedro Suárez Vértiz, Patricio Suárez Vértiz and Arturo Pomar. Between the 1980s and early 1990s, he was the keyboardist of the band, and also did some singing. A few years later the band broke up and some of its members pursued a solo career.

In 1996, Meier released an album, No Me Acuerdo Quién Fui, which produced the singles, "tus huellas entre la mías", and "Carreteras Mojadas" ("Wet Highways") that got the first positions in almost all radio station charts in Peru. the album went double platinum. In 1997 began the production of his second album, Primero en Mojarme, with Manuel Garrido-Lecca, a well known musical producer that he worked with in Arena Hash. 

In 2002, he produced Once Noches, probably the album that brought him the most accolades. It contained the singles "Alguien" and "Novia de nadie" a duet featuring Spanish singer Mikel Erentxun.

Acting
Meier has acted and starred in both soap operas and movies. His success has brought him fame in Latin American countries, in the US, Spanish speaking media, and around the Spanish speaking world. He also has his line of perfumes and appeared in commercials.

Personal life
He married Peruvian actress Marisol Aguirre in 1995. They met during the filming of the soap opera "Gorrión". They separated in October 2007, finalizing their divorce in November 2008. They have three children together.

Discography

With Arena Hash 
 Arena Hash (1988)
 Ah Ah Ah (1991)
 El Archivo De Arena Hash (1995)

Solo career 
 No Me Acuerdo Quien Fuí (1996)
 Primero En Mojarme (1999)
 Once Noches (2002)
 Nada Ha Cambiado (2016)

Filmography

Film roles

Television roles

References

External links
 Listen to the songs of Christian Meier on Spotify
 

1970 births
Living people
20th-century Peruvian male actors
21st-century Peruvian male actors
Peruvian expatriates in Colombia
Peruvian expatriates in the United States
Peruvian people of German descent
Peruvian people of Swiss descent
Peruvian male film actors
20th-century Peruvian male singers
20th-century Peruvian singers
Peruvian male telenovela actors
Male actors from Lima
Singers from Lima
21st-century Peruvian male singers
21st-century Peruvian singers